Tema East is one of the constituencies represented in the Parliament of Ghana. It elects one Member of Parliament (MP) by the first past the post system of election. Tema East is located in the Tema Municipal District of the Greater Accra Region of Ghana.

Boundaries 
The constituency is located within the Accra Metropolis District of the Greater Accra Region of Ghana. It consists of Tema Newtown and Community one

Members of Parliament

Elections

See also
List of Ghana Parliament constituencies

References 

Parliamentary constituencies in the Greater Accra Region